Organized Crime & Triad Bureau is a 1994 Hong Kong action crime thriller film produced and directed by Kirk Wong, starring Danny Lee, Cecilia Yip, Anthony Wong, Fan Siu-wong, Roy Cheung and Louis Koo in his debut film role. In 1996, Tai Seng Video Marketing made a concerted effort to introduce the film to American audiences, and it has developed a following among fans of action film. The film was selected to be shown in Anthology Film Archives in 2018.

Plot
Inspector Lee of the Organized Crime & Triad Bureau goes beyond the laws of Hong Kong in the hunt for a notorious robbery ring, led by Ho Kin-tung and Cindy.

Cast
Danny Lee as Inspector Rambo Lee Chun-san (李鎮山)
Anthony Wong as Ho Kin-tung (何建東)
Cecilia Yip as Cindy (阿詩)
Fan Siu-wong as Tak (阿德)
Roy Cheung as Inspector Lau Siu-chau (劉少秋)
Louis Koo as Tung's underling

Note

See also
 List of Hong Kong films

External links

1994 films
1994 action thriller films
1994 crime thriller films
1990s police procedural films
Hong Kong action thriller films
Hong Kong crime thriller films
Police detective films
1990s Cantonese-language films
Films set in Hong Kong
Films shot in Hong Kong
1990s Hong Kong films